Bruce Lindley McCormack (born 1952) is Charles Hodge Professor of Systematic Theology at Princeton Theological Seminary. His work focuses on the history of modern theology. McCormack has proposed that Karl Barth's view of Scripture has been misinterpreted, and has proposed a "Neo-Barthian" interpretation.

Background and career
After graduating from Point Loma Nazarene University and earned the bachelor degree in economic/business administration and religion in 1976, McCormack began his journey of theological education in the Covenant Theological Seminary (Missouri) in the late 1970s. In 1978, he transferred his studies to his original denominational seminary, Nazarene Theological Seminary and earned his M.Div. degree there in 1980. He recalled being moved from a Wesleyan-Arminian perspective to a Reformed one in Nazarene Theological Seminary after he was disappointed by John Wesley’s doctrine of prevenient grace.

In 1980, he got married with Mary Schmidt McCormack who is now serving as the director of women’s ministries in Stone Hill Church of Princeton.

He received his Ph.D. from Princeton Theological Seminary in 1989. 

He was awarded the international Karl Barth Prize by the Board of the Evangelical Church of the Union in Germany in 1998. This was given to his publication Karl Barth’s Critically Realistic Dialectical Theology (1995), in which a paradigm shift of reading Barth was proposed in the studies of Karl Barth. He also holds an honorary doctorate of theology awarded by the Friedrich-Schiller University of Jena in Germany in 2004.

Teachings

McCormack served as the Lecturer in Reformed Theology in the University of Edinburgh from 1987-1991. He later returned to his 
alma mater, Princeton Theological Seminary and took the role of Weyerhaeuser Associate Professor of Systematic Theology from 1991-1998, and became the Weyerhaeuser Professor of Systematic Theology starting from 1998 onwards. Since 2009, 
McCormack served as the Charles Hodge Professor of Systematic Theology until now.

He was also invited to be the speaker of The T.F. Torrance Lectures (2008, titled “The Humility of the Eternal Son: A Reformed Version of Kenotic Christology”) in the University of St. Andrews, The Croall Lectures (2011, titled “Abandoned by God: The Death of Christ in Systematic, Historical, and Exegetical Perspective”) in the University of Edinburgh, and The Kenneth Kantzer Lectures (2011, titled “The God Who Graciously Elects: Seven Lectures on the Doctrine of God”) in the Trinity Evangelical Divinity School.

Works

Books

Articles and chapters

References 

Princeton Theological Seminary faculty
20th-century Calvinist and Reformed theologians
21st-century Calvinist and Reformed theologians
American Calvinist and Reformed theologians
1952 births
Living people